In Islam, Abd al-Uzza ibn Qusai forms an important link between his father, Qusai ibn Kilab (c. 400–480), the great-great-grandfather of Shaiba ibn Hashim (Abd al-Mutallib) and his son Asad ibn Abd al-Uzza. 

The name Abd al-Uzza derives from one of the three chief gods of Arabian religion in pre-Islamic times, al-Uzza.

References

5th-century Arabs